Jirka Letzin (born February 8, 1971, in Neubrandenburg) is a retired backstroke and medley swimmer from Germany. He won his first major title in 1994, at the European Short Course Championships in Stavanger. He represented his native country at the 2000 Summer Olympics in Sydney, Australia, finishing in 9th place in the men's 400 m individual medley.

References
  Profile

1971 births
Living people
German male swimmers
Male backstroke swimmers
Male medley swimmers
Swimmers at the 2000 Summer Olympics
Olympic swimmers of Germany
Medalists at the FINA World Swimming Championships (25 m)
European Aquatics Championships medalists in swimming
Goodwill Games medalists in swimming
People from Neubrandenburg
Competitors at the 1998 Goodwill Games
Sportspeople from Mecklenburg-Western Pomerania
20th-century German people
21st-century German people